The Istana Lama was a palace once located at Telok Blangah in Singapore. It was first built for Temenggong Abdul Rahman in 1824. It had since been demolished in 1954.

History
About four years after the Treaty was signed in 1819 which marked Singapore as a British settlement, Temenggong Abdul Rahman, his family and followers moved to the 200 acres of land (part of Teluk Belanga area) as assigned by Sir Stamford Raffles. The European-style mansion known as Istana Lama was built and completed in 1824.

Temenggong Abdul Rahman died in this house on 8 December 1825 and was buried at the nearby Makam Diraja Teluk Blangah. His eldest son Tun Haji Abdullah first informally succeed him as the de facto Temenggong of Johor.

The house was later refurnished with concrete structures by his second son Daeng Ibrahim in 1830, who would informally succeed Tun Haji Abdullah as the Temonggong in 1833. It was noted for being the birthplace for Temenggong Daeng Ibrahim's son Abu Bakar, his eventual successor and future Sultan of Johor, who was born on 3 February 1833.

Temenggong Daeng Ibrahim was officially made known on 19 August 1841, and upon becoming the de facto Maharajah of Johor on 10 March 1855, he began to administer his territory Iskandar Puteri from this residence.

Demolition
Temenggong Daeng Ibrahim died in the house on 31 January 1862 and was buried at the nearby Makam on the following day, his son Abu Bakar succeed him as the Temenggong on 2 February 1862 and soon moved his residence to Tyersall. The house was demolished in 1954.

Aftermath
On 9 April 1964, the Bata Shoe Factory was officially opened by the then Finance Minister Dr Goh Keng Swee on about half of its former site from the bottom, with the address of 66 Telok Blangah Road and was granted a 30-year lease in May. The factory eventually closed and was demolished by 1994.

In 1995, a condominium known as Harbourlights was built on the former site of the shoe factory and was completed by 1997.

Currently, near the Harbourlights condominium, remnants of the palace's historic Dutch-bricked platform structure, its drain network and nearby former gate posts can be still seen among its surrounding overgrown vegetation.

References

Demolished buildings and structures in Singapore
Buildings and structures demolished in 1954
Places in Singapore
Palaces in Singapore
Royal residences in Singapore
Protected areas of Singapore
Houses completed in 1824
1824 establishments in the British Empire
1954 disestablishments in the British Empire
1824 establishments in the Straits Settlements
1824 establishments in Singapore
1954 disestablishments in Singapore
19th-century architecture in Singapore